Chef Alan Yu, (born 24 January 1971), born in Shanghai and raised in Washington, D.C., has worked in several kitchens around the world. His passion to work with food has led Yu to work at, and head up, some of New York City's and Washington DC's most desirable restaurants, including the original Jean-Georges Vongerichten and Michel Richard Citronelle. In Shanghai, he cooked at Le Plantane, 8 ½ Otto e Mezzo Bombana – an offshoot of the three-Michelin star original in Hong Kong, Nice Meeting You – Chinese author Han Han restaurant, and most recently his own restaurant Le Rivage – a fine dining concept, situated on the northern stretch of the Bund.

Awards and honors 
Jury - S.Pellegrino Young Chef 2016

References 
 Bowen, Dana (2004-09-29). “"New York Story: Local Garlic Makes Good". The New York Times. Retrieved 2018-02-18."
 Liau, Monica (2014-05-06). “"New restaurant: Nice Meeting You". that's Shanghai. Retrieved 2018-02-18.
 探店说起米其林三星Chef Alan Yu. Shanghai WOW!. 26 December 2016. Retrieved 2018-02-18.

 Alan's Bistro [Shanghai. Heels on the Go. 22 March 2017. Retrieved 2018-02-18.

Specific

External links 

 8 ½ Otto e Mezzo Bombana

1971 births
Living people
People from Shanghai
Chinese chefs